Herrington Lake is a  artificial lake located in Mercer, Garrard and Boyle counties in Kentucky, United States. The lake was created by Kentucky Utilities' damming of the Dix River, a tributary of the Kentucky River, in 1925 to generate hydroelectric power. A short distance below the dam, the Dix River enters the Kentucky River at High Bridge, Kentucky.

Herrington Lake contains many species of fish, including bluegill, catfish, crappie, hybrid striped bass, largemouth bass, spotted bass, and white bass.

Dix Dam, the dam that made the lake, was the largest earth-filled dam in the world at the time, and considered to be a major engineering feat. Kentucky Utilities' main dispatch and communication center is located on the site.

References

Reservoirs in Kentucky
1925 establishments in Kentucky
Bodies of water of Boyle County, Kentucky
Bodies of water of Mercer County, Kentucky
Bodies of water of Garrard County, Kentucky
E.ON
Tourist attractions in Boyle County, Kentucky
Tourist attractions in Mercer County, Kentucky
Tourist attractions in Garrard County, Kentucky